Ha Sebin is a South Korean musician. He is the leader and lead guitarist of rock band Nemesis, and joined EVE as a guitarist in 2003. He has composed and arranged for both bands and produced Nemesis' debut album la Rose de Versailles. He also wrote all the music for the OST of the MBC drama miniseries .

Ha Sebin's music style is a post-modern mix of classical music and modern rock styles. He majored in post-modern music while at Kyunghee University, and plays the piano, guitar, as well as some other unidentified string instrument(s).

Discography

Nemesis 
 2002: Nemesis (demo album)
 2004: Nemesis – Fragmented Love – (digital single)
 2005: Nemesis – la Rose de Versailles
 2009: Nemesis vol.2 – Lovesick

EVE
 2003: Welcome to Planet EVE
 2004: The History of EVE
 2004: The History of EVE DVD
 2006: sEVEnth evening

Solo projects

OST 
 2006: Search for Dorothy OST

References

External links
 Nemesis Official Site (Korean)

South Korean rock guitarists
South Korean songwriters
1983 births
Living people
21st-century guitarists